In the 1981 Virginia gubernatorial election, Republican incumbent Governor John N. Dalton was unable to seek re-election due to term limits. Chuck Robb, the Lieutenant Governor of Virginia, was nominated by the Democratic Party to run against the Republican nominee, state Attorney General J. Marshall Coleman.

Candidates
Chuck Robb, Lieutenant Governor of Virginia (D)
J. Marshall Coleman, Attorney General of Virginia (R)

Results

References

Gubernatorial
1981
Virginia
November 1981 events in the United States